Örjan Jonsson (born 8 November 1969) is a Swedish curler.

Teams

References

External links
 
 

Living people
1969 births
Swedish male curlers
Swedish curling champions
20th-century Swedish people